Capão do Cipó is a municipality of the western part of the state of Rio Grande do Sul, Brazil. The population is 3,699 (2020 est.) in an area of 1,120.87 km². The economy is mainly agricultural and it contains 500 square kilometres of soybean production.

References

External links
http://www.citybrazil.com.br/rs/capaodocipo/ 

Municipalities in Rio Grande do Sul